Trigoniomachilis is a genus of jumping bristletails in the family Machilidae. There are at least four described species in Trigoniomachilis.

Species
These four species belong to the genus Trigoniomachilis:
 Trigoniomachilis remyiana Wygodzinsky, 1958
 Trigoniomachilis saovensis Bach, 1982
 Trigoniomachilis thessalica Wygodzinsky, 1958
 Trigoniomachilis urumovi Stach, 1937

References

Further reading

 
 
 
 
 

Archaeognatha
Articles created by Qbugbot